The 2020 FIM Bajas World Cup season was the 9th season of the FIM Bajas World Cup, an international rally raid competition for motorbikes, quads, and SSV.

Calendar
The calendar for the 2020 season had six baja-style events originally scheduled; two of which in Portugal, with some of the bajas also being part of 2020 FIA World Cup for Cross-Country Bajas.
Due to COVID-19 pandemic a new, reduced schedule was issued.

Regulation Changes
Starting with the 2020 season the vehicle classes have been reorganized into the following categories:
Category 1: Bike (up to 450cc)
Category 2: Quads (three-wheeled vehicles are forbidden)
Category 3: SSV
Category 4: Women
Category 5: Junior
Category 6: Veterans

The FIM will award the world cup to both rider and manufacturers of the bike category; as well as to riders only in the quad, SSV, woman, and junior categories. A trophy is awarded to the winners of the veterans category. No awards are given to anything above 450cc.

Teams and riders

Results

Positions shown are not overall race positions but positions within the FIM Bajas World Cup. Both classifications may coincide.

Motorbikes

Quads

SSV

Championship standings

Riders' championship
 Points for final positions are awarded as follows:

Motorbikes

Positions shown are not overall race positions but positions within the FIM Bajas World Cup classification.

Quads

Women, Junior & Veteran

SSV

References

External links
 

FIM Cross-Country Rallies World Championship
Bajas World Cup
Bajas